The following is the list of notable banks in Pakistan. State Bank of Pakistan is the Central Bank of Pakistan.

Systemically Important Banks

Domestically Systemically Important Banks 

 Habib Bank Limited (HBL)
 National Bank of Pakistan (NBP)
 United Bank Limited (UBL)

Total number of Schedule Banks 
 Al Baraka Bank (Pakistan) Limited
 Allied Bank Limited (ABL)
 Askari Bank
 Bank Alfalah Limited (BAFL)
 Bank Al-Habib Limited (BAHL)
 BankIslami Pakistan Limited
 Bank of Punjab (BOP)
 Bank of Khyber
 Deutsche Bank A.G
 Dubai Islamic Bank Pakistan Limited (DIB Pakistan)
 Faysal Bank Limited (FBL)
 First Women Bank Limited
 Habib Bank Limited (HBL)
 Habib Metropolitan Bank Limited
 Industrial and Commercial Bank of China
 Industrial Development Bank of Pakistan
 JS Bank Limited
 MCB Bank Limited 
 MCB Islamic Bank Limited
 Meezan Bank Limited
 National Bank of Pakistan (NBP)
 Summit Bank Pakistan
 Standard Chartered Bank (Pakistan) Limited (SC Pakistan)
 Sindh Bank
 The Bank of Tokyo-Mitsubishi UFJ (MUFG Bank Pakistan)
 United Bank Limited (UBL)
 Zarai Taraqiati Bank Limited

Public Sector Schedule Banks 
 National Bank of Pakistan (NBP)
 Bank of Punjab (BOP)
 Sindh Bank
 Bank of Khyber
 First Women Bank
 Zarai Taraqiati Bank Limited

Public Sector Non-Schedule Banks 
 Bank of Azad Jammu & Kashmir

Private Banks 
 Askari Bank
 Al Baraka Bank (Pakistan) Limited
 Allied Bank Limited (ABL)
 Bank Alfalah (BAFL)
 Bank Al Habib (BAHL)
 BankIslami Pakistan Limited
 Dubai Islamic Bank Pakistan Limited (DIB Pakistan)
 Faysal Bank (FBL)
 Habib Bank Limited (HBL)
 Habib Metropolitan Bank
 Habib Bank AG Zurich
 JS Bank
 Meezan Bank Limited
 MCB Bank Limited
 Samba Bank (Pakistan) Limited
 Silkbank Limited
 Standard Chartered Pakistan (SC Pakistan)
 Soneri Bank
 Summit Bank
 United Bank Limited (UBL)

Islamic banks 

Many Islamic banks are working in Pakistan. The list of banks is given below:
 Allied Aitebar Islamic Banking
 Meezan Bank Limited
 Soneri Mustaqeem Islamic Bank
 Dubai Islamic Bank
 Al Baraka Bank
 Bank Alfalah Islamic
 BankIslami Pakistan Limited
 Askari Bank Ltd
 MCB Islamic Banking
 UBL Islamic Banking
 HBL Islamic Banking
 National Bank of Pakistan
 Bank Al Habib Islamic Banking
 Bank of Punjab Islamic Banking
 Faysal Bank (Islamic)
HabibMetro (Sirat Islamic Banking)
Silk Bank (Emaan Islamic Banking)
These are the names of Islamic banks having accreditation licenses from the State Bank of Pakistan.

Foreign banks 
 Deutsche Bank AG (Deutsche Bank Pakistan)  
 Citi Bank N.A (CitiBank N.A Pakistan) 
 Industrial and Commercial Bank of China Limited (ICBC Pakistan) 
 Bank of China (Bank of China Pakistan Branch) 
The Hong Kong and Shanghai Bank (HSBC Bank Pakistan) 
 The Bank of Tokyo-Mitsubishi UFJ (MUFG Bank Pakistan) 
Standard Chartered Bank (Standard Chartered Bank Pakistan)

Microfinance Banks 
 Finca Microfinance Bank
 U Microfinance Bank  (UPaisa)
 Mobilink Microfinance Bank (JazzCash)
 Khushhali Microfinance Bank
 NRSP Microfinance Bank
 Telenor Microfinance Bank (EasyPaisa)
 NayaPay
 SadaPay

Development finance institutions 
 House Building Finance Corporation

See also
 Banking in Pakistan
 Defunct banks of Pakistan
 List of companies of Pakistan
 Economy of Pakistan
 Index of the Karachi Stock Exchange
 Islamic banking
 List of largest banks
 List of financial regulatory authorities by country

References

External links
 Addresses of banks/development finance institutions being regulated by State Bank of Pakistan
 SBP Members Financial Institutions List
 List of Banks in Pakistan 2014-15
 Pakistani Banks (as of November 2007)

Banks
 
Pakistan
Pakistan